Kiko en Lala is a 2019 Philippine comedy film directed by Adolfo B. Alix Jr. The film stars Super Tekla in his movie debut. Produced by GMA Pictures' subsidiary Backyard Productions, the film was initially titled Kambal Karnabal.

Cast
Super Tekla as Kiko / Lala
Derrick Monasterio as Rap-rap
Kim Domingo as Aning
Kiray Celis as Miracle
Jo Berry as Tadhana
Divine Tetay as Wagas
Ai-Ai de las Alas as Deadline
Gia Navarro as a waitress
Ken Chan as Boyet
 Rita Daniela as Aubrey

Release
The film was slated to be released in May 2019. But due to film enhancements, its release date was moved to September 25, 2019.

References

External links

2019 films
Filipino-language films
Philippine comedy films
GMA Pictures films